Wambeen is an evil god of Australian Aboriginal mythology. Known for his lightning hurling figure, like many other subjects of ancient tales, Wambeen prefers travelers for his victims. Said to come down to earth to smite wanderers, he was recognized only by his smell of evil.

References

Mercatante, Anthony S.. "Wambeen."The facts On File Encyclopedia of world Mythology and Legend. 1988.

Australian Aboriginal gods